Case Closed: The Culprit Hanzawa, also known as  is a Japanese manga series written and illustrated by Mayuko Kanba. It is a spin-off of the original manga Detective Conan by Gosho Aoyama and stars the black-silhouetted "criminal" that appears in the main series to represent the mystery culprits. Kanba launched the manga in Shogakukan's Shōnen Sunday S in May 2017 and its chapters have been collected in seven tankōbon volumes as of September 2022. An anime television series adaptation by TMS Entertainment aired from October to December 2022.

Characters

Media

Manga
Detective Conan: The Culprit Hanzawa is written and illustrated by Mayuko Kanba. It is a spin-off of the original manga Detective Conan by Gosho Aoyama and stars the black-silhouetted "criminal" that appears in the main series to represent the mystery culprits. The manga began in the July 2017 issue of Shogakukan's Shōnen Sunday S, released on May 25, 2017. The series 30th chapter was published on November 25, 2019, the 31st chapter on February 25, 2020, and the 32nd chapter on May 25, 2020. The series resumed publication on December 25, 2020. Shogakukan has compiled its chapters into individual tankōbon volumes. The first volume was released on December 18, 2017. As of September 15, 2022, seven volumes have been released.

Volume list

Anime
On October 4, 2021, it was announced that the manga will receive an anime adaptation. In November 2021, at Netflix's "Festival Japan" virtual event, it was revealed that they would stream the series. It is produced by TMS Entertainment and directed by Akitaro Daichi, with character designs handled by Fū Chisaka, and music composed by Jun Abe and Seiji Muto. The series aired on Tokyo MX, ytv and BS Nippon from October 4 to December 20, 2022. The opening theme song is "Tsukamaete, Konya." by Leon Niihama, and the ending theme song is "Secret, Voice of My Heart" by Mai Kuraki. The series premiered on Netflix outside of Japan on Netflix on February 1, 2023.

Episode list

Reception
The manga ranked 14th on the "Nationwide Bookstore Employees' Recommended Comics of 2018". By October 2018, the manga had over 1 million copies in circulation.

Notes

References

External links
 

Anime series based on manga
Case Closed
Comedy anime and manga
Comics spin-offs
Japanese-language Netflix original programming
Netflix original anime
Shogakukan manga
Shōnen manga
TMS Entertainment